Sagitario may refer to:
Sagitario (album), Ana Gabriel
Sagitário, in 2007 the first Portuguese warship with a female commander Centauro-class fiscalization boat
Sagitario, 1920s Mexican anarcho-syndicalist newspaper edited by Librado Rivera
Sagitario Films, producers of Four Women (1947 film) and other films
Sagitario (film), 2001 film directed by Vicente Molina Foix, starring Ángela Molina and Eusebio Poncela, Julieta Serrano
Makatea, island which was called "Sagitario" in 1606 by Pedro Fernandes de Queirós